Dez Anos Ao Vivo (Ten Years Live) is a live CD and DVD by Brazilian hard rock band Dr. Sin, released in 2003. It was recorded at SESC Ipiranga in Sao Paulo, Brazil, in 23 and 24 May 2002.

Track listing

CD 1
"Time After Time"
"Sometimes"
"Fly Away"
"Danger"
"Stone Cold Dead"
"Isolated"
"The Fire Burns Cold"
"Years Gone"
"Revolution"

CD 2
"No Rules"
"Eternity"
"Living and Learning"
"Zero"
"Down in the Trenches (pt. I & II)
"Karma"
"Emotional Catastrophe"
"Futebol, mulher e Rock n' Roll"
"Fire" (feat. Andre Matos)

Personnel
Andria Busic (Bass and Lead Vocals)
Ivan Busic  (Drums and vocals)
Edu Ardanuy  (Guitar)

Special guests
Marco Sergio (Xarango)
Marcus Cezar (percussion)
Marcelo Souss (keyboards)
Andre Matos (only in music Fire)

Dr. Sin albums
2003 live albums
2003 video albums
Live video albums